The Butler Area School District is a very large school district in western Pennsylvania. The district operates ten schools -- Center Township Elementary School (grades K-6), Connoquenessing Elementary School (grades K-6), Emily Brittain Community Partnership and Demonstration School (grades K-6), McQuistion Elementary School (grades K-6), Northwest Elementary School (grades K-6), Summit Elementary School (grades K-6), Butler Intermediate High School (grades 6-8), Butler Senior High School (grades 9-12), and Center Avenue Community School (grades K-12).

The 2006 enrollment for elementary students is 4310 students and for secondary schools is 3946 students.

References

External links
Official site
School District sports website

School districts in Butler County, Pennsylvania
Education in Pittsburgh area
Butler, Pennsylvania